Teresa Rioné (born 23 March 1965) is a Spanish sprinter. She competed in the women's 100 metres at the 1984 Summer Olympics.

References

External links
 

1965 births
Living people
Athletes (track and field) at the 1984 Summer Olympics
Spanish female sprinters
Olympic athletes of Spain
Place of birth missing (living people)
Olympic female sprinters